Matatā is a town in New Zealand.

Matata may also refer to:

New Zealand

 Mātātā, Māori name for New Zealand fernbird
 Mātātā, Māori name for Rhabdothamnus solandri, a shrub

Other places
 Matata, Eswatini
 Matata, Ermera Municipality, East Timor

Other uses
 Matata, a religious figure associated with the history of Adjara, a province of Georgia
 Kanzi or Matata, a bonobo featured in several studies on great ape language
 The latter part of the Swahili phrase hakuna matata (translates: no problem)

See also
 "Hakuna Matata" (song)
 Hakuna matata (wasp)
 Hakuna Matata Restaurant, Disneyland Paris
 Afrika (video game), known in south-east Asia as "Hakuna Matata"